Michael Kreitl (born December 6, 1975) is a German professional ice hockey forward who currently plays for EC Peiting of the German Oberliga.

External links

1975 births
Living people
German ice hockey forwards
Augsburger Panther players
EC Peiting players
People from Weilheim-Schongau
Sportspeople from Upper Bavaria